An Orphan's Tragedy is a 1955 Hong Kong drama film co-written and directed by Chu Kei and starring Bruce Lee, Ng Cho-fan, Lau Hak-suen, Josephine Siao and Cheung Wood-yau. The film is a loose adaptation of Charles Dickens' 1861 novel Great Expectations.

Plot
Profiteer To Chai-yan (Lau Hak-suen) framed Dickson Fan (Ng Cho-fan) for selling counterfeit medicine which led Fan to ten years of unjust imprisonment. Fan escapes prison to a rural farm where he meets teenager Frank Wong (Bruce Lee), who helps him escapade arrest from the police. Later on, Fan discovers that Frank is his biological son and he finds a job outside at the provincial capital in order to earn money and anonymously pay for Frank to study medicine outside of town. Frank, not knowing that Fan is his father, believes that Fan is donating money to him out of gratitude. After graduating, Frank works at To's medical company. To has always suspected Frank to be Fan's son. In order to force Fan to come out of hiding, To frames Frank the way that he framed Fan back then.

Cast
Bruce Lee as child Frank Wong Fuk-wan (based on Philip Pirrip)
Cheung Wood-yau as adult Frank Wong Fuk-wan
Ng Cho-fan as Dickson Fan (based on Abel Magwitch)
Wong Cho-san as Sam Wong (based on Joe Gargery)
Lau Hak-suen as To Chai-yan (based on Compeyson)
Josephine Siao as child Polly/Pui-yee (based on Estella Havisham)
Yung Siu-yee as adult Polly/Pui-yee
 Mui Yee - Rainbow/Choi-Hung
Chow Chi-sing as Chow
Ko Lo-chuen as Kwai
Lee Pang-fei as Joseph Chan
Wong Fei-fei as child Rainbow/Choi-hung
Yip Ping as Mrs. Fan
Ling Mung as Yau
Kam Lau as Polly's mother (based on Miss Havisham)
Cheung Sang as Village neighbor (based on Mr. Hubble)
Chan Lap-ban as Village neighbor (based on Mrs. Hubble)
Chu Yau-ko as Dancing at nightclub 
Yuen Lap-cheung as Pharmacy customer
Lam Liu-ngok as To's goon
Fung King-man as To's goon

See also
Bruce Lee filmography

References

External links

An Orphan's Tragedy at Hong Kong Cinemagic

 An Orphan's Tragedy at senscritique.com

1955 films
1955 drama films
Hong Kong drama films
Melodrama films
1950s Cantonese-language films
Films based on Great Expectations
Hong Kong black-and-white films
Films set in Hong Kong
Films shot in Hong Kong
Films set in the 20th century